Acer stachyophyllum is an Asian species of maple. It is native to China (Gansu, Henan, Hubei, Ningxia, Shaanxi, Sichuan, Tibet, Yunnan), Myanmar, northern India, Bhutan, and Nepal.

Acer stachyophyllum is a deciduous tree up to 15 meters tall with smooth yellow-brown bark. It is dioecious, meaning that male and female flowers are on separate trees. Leaves are non-compound, up to 11 cm wide and 6 cm across, thin and papery, sometimes with no lobes but sometimes with 3.

Subspecies
 Acer stachyophyllum subsp. betulifolium (Maxim.) P.C.DeJong — Gansu, Henan, Hubei, Ningxia, Shaanxi, Sichuan, Yunnan, Myanmar
 Acer stachyophyllum subsp. stachyophyllum  — Hubei, Sichuan, Tibet, Yunnan, Bhutan, India, Myanmar, Nepal

References

External links
Line drawing for Flora of China subsp. stachyophyllum at top; subsp. betulifolium at bottom

stachyophyllum
Trees of China
Trees of the Indian subcontinent
Trees of Myanmar
Dioecious plants
Plants described in 1875